Sutro Heights Park is an historic public park in the Outer Richmond District of western San Francisco, California. It is within the Golden Gate National Recreation Area and the Sutro Historic District.

It is located above the Cliff House in the Lands End area, with views of the Seal Rocks, Ocean Beach, and the Pacific Ocean.

History 

The  park is on the site of the former "Sutro Heights" estate of Adolph Sutro, a Comstock Lode silver baron, and a major land owner/developer in and mayor of San Francisco.

In 1881, Adolf Sutro purchased  of undeveloped land south of Point Lobos (San Francisco) and north of Ocean Beach at the western edge of the city. It included a promontory overlooking the Pacific, with scenic views of the Marin Headlands, Mount Tamalpais, and the Golden Gate. Sutro built his mansion on a rocky ledge there, above the first Cliff House.

The grounds consisted of a spacious turreted mansion, a carriage house, and outbuildings set in expansive gardens. The estate dominated the Lands End area, with an elaborate entrance gate. He spent in excess of a million dollars to recreate an Italian style garden. It was filled with fountains, planted urns, and statues, Victorian flower beds, hedge mazes, parterres, forests of trees, a glass plant conservatory, and other garden structures. Vista points included the "observation plaza" overlooking the Cliff House, and the "Dolce far Niente Balcony," a long terrace-like structure along the cliff overlooking Ocean Beach. To provide garden decorations, he imported over 200 concrete replicas of Greek and Roman statuary from Belgium, to provide examples of European culture to visitors.

By 1883 Sutro opened his estate's gardens, named Sutro Heights, to the public and allowed strolling the grounds for the donation of a dime. That small fee helped to pay the 17 gardeners, machinists, and drivers he employed to maintain the grounds.

Other features he developed on his land holdings in the Lands End area include: the Sutro Baths (1894-1964), the second and elaborate Victorian style Cliff House (1896-1907)  and an amusement park named Sutro Pleasure Grounds at Merrie Way (1896-1898). To provide inexpensive transportation for visitors to these he built a passenger steam train from downtown San Francisco to Lands End.

Adolph Sutro died in 1898, land rich but cash poor following his frustrating tenure as Mayor of San Francisco. His daughter Emma Sutro Merritt moved to the Sutro Heights estate then. As she aged she could not maintain the grounds, and the house became seriously deteriorated, though she lived there until her death in 1938. Throughout the 1920s, ‘30s, and ‘40s, people took away many of the rose garden plantings and vandalized the statues.

Park 

The Sutro family donated the estate to the City of San Francisco in 1938. In 1939 the Works Progress Administration (WPA) demolished the residence. Remaining statuary was removed, with the exception of The Lions, copies of those in London's Trafalgar Square at the entrance gate, and a statue of Diana the Huntress (Artemis), a concrete copy of the Louvre's Diana, itself a Roman copy of a Greek statue. The   city park then opened.

Sutro Heights Park is no longer a city park, it is part of the Golden Gate National Recreation Area. It is maintained by a neighborhood group, Friends of the GGNRA, many of whom live on the surrounding streets.

See also

Cliff House, San Francisco
Lands End, San Francisco
Sutro Baths
49-Mile Scenic Drive
Golden Gate National Recreation Area

References

External links

  NPS−Golden Gate National Recreation Area: Visiting Lands End
 NPS-GGNRA: Lands End History and Culture
 Vestiges of Lands End — digital guidebook.

Parks in San Francisco
Golden Gate National Recreation Area
Urban public parks
History of San Francisco
Historic district contributing properties in California
Richmond District, San Francisco
National Register of Historic Places in San Francisco
Parks on the National Register of Historic Places in California
Protected areas established in 1938
1938 establishments in California